Concord is the largest city in Contra Costa County, California. According to an estimate completed by the United States Census Bureau, the city had a population of 129,295 in 2019, making it the eighth largest city in the San Francisco Bay Area. Founded in 1869 as Todos Santos by Don Salvio Pacheco II, a noted Californio ranchero, the name was later changed to Concord.

The United States Census Bureau defines an urban area in the East Bay which is separated from the San Francisco–Oakland urban area and with Concord as the principal city: the Concord–Walnut Creek, CA urban area had a population of 538,583 as of the 2020 census, making it the 80th largest in the United States.

History 

The valleys north of Mount Diablo were inhabited by the Miwok people, who hunted elk and fished in the numerous streams flowing from the mountain into the San Francisco Bay. It is important to note Miwok and other indigenous people still live within city limits. In 1772, Spanish explorers began to cross the area but did not settle there. In 1834, the Mexican land grant Rancho Monte del Diablo at the base of Mount Diablo was granted to Salvio Pacheco (for whom the nearby town of Pacheco is named).

Concord was founded under the name of Todos Santos ("all saints"; a name still borne by the central city plaza and park between Willow Pass Road and Salvio Street), on the initiative of Pacheco in 1869. It achieved prominence in the 19th century, when most residents of Pacheco relocated to Concord to avoid the devastation of fire and flood which crippled Pacheco's formerly booming economy. Concord was incorporated on February 5, 1905.

The area around Concord in the surrounding Ygnacio and Clayton Valleys was a large agricultural area. Crops that were grown included grapes, walnuts, almonds, wheat, hay, and even tomatoes. During Prohibition, many vineyards were removed and replaced with walnut orchards. The town of Cowell, now incorporated into Concord, produced cement.

The first Concord post office opened in 1872.

Port Chicago disaster 

The munitions on board a Navy cargo ship exploded while being loaded during World War II, resulting in the largest number of casualties among African Americans in any one incident during that war. On the evening of July 17, 1944, a massive explosion instantly killed 320 sailors, merchant seamen, and civilians working at the pier. A subsequent refusal by 258 black sailors to load any more ammunition was the beginning of the Navy's largest-ever mutiny trial, in which 50 men were found guilty. Future Supreme Court Justice Thurgood Marshall sat in on most of the proceedings and declared that he saw a prejudiced court.

Geography 

The focal point of downtown Concord is Todos Santos Plaza, which encompasses an entire city block and is known for its farmers market, free summer concerts, and large number of surrounding restaurants. Much of the area immediately around downtown has recently been redeveloped, with new high-density apartment and condominium projects to take advantage of the proximity to public transportation and to the area surrounding the park. Despite this, some crime and homelessness remain issues in the downtown area.

To the north and east of downtown is the older residential area of Concord, with many homes dating back to before World War II. In the far northern edge of town is a primarily industrial area, dominated by the Tesoro Golden Eagle Refinery (which is actually not located within city limits). The southeastern area of the city, centered along Clayton Road, is primarily residential and was mostly developed in the 1960s and 1970s. In the southwest area of the city is the primarily Latino neighborhood known as Four Corners, centered around the intersection of Monument Boulevard and Oak Grove Road.

Concord is bordered on the west by Pleasant Hill and the unincorporated community of Pacheco, on the south by Walnut Creek, on the southeast by Clayton, on the northeast by Pittsburg and the unincorporated community of Bay Point, and on the north by the unincorporated community of Clyde. Although it shares no border with Concord, Martinez (the county seat) is located almost immediately adjacent to Concord on the northwest. The North Concord BART station is also known as Martinez BART.

Climate 

Concord has a warm-summer Mediterranean climate (Köppen Csb), with warm, dry summers and cool, wet winters.

Demographics 

The 2010 United States Census reported that Concord had a population of 122,067. The ethnic makeup of Concord was 78,767 (64.5%) White,  4,371 (3.6%) African American, 852 (0.7%) Native American, 13,538 (11.1%) Asian (4.4% Filipino, 2.4% Chinese, 1.3% Indian, 0.7% Vietnamese, 0.6% Japanese, 0.6% Korean), 816 (0.7%) Pacific Islander, 15,969 (13.1%) from other ethnicities, and 7,754 (6.4%) from two or more ethnicities. Hispanic   or Latino of any ethnicity were 37,311 persons (30.6%).

The Census reported that 121,020 people (99.1% of the population) lived in households, 512 (0.4%) lived in non-institutionalized group quarters, and 535 (0.4%) were institutionalized.

There were 44,278 households, out of which 15,421 (34.8%) had children under the age of 18 living in them, 21,725 (49.1%) were opposite-sex married couples living together, 5,642 (12.7%) had a female householder with no husband present, 2,707 (6.1%) had a male householder with no wife present. There were 2,952 (6.7%) unmarried opposite-sex partnerships, and 512 (1.2%) same-sex married couples or partnerships. 10,406 households (23.5%) were made up of individuals, and 3,625 (8.2%) had someone living alone who was 65 years of age or older. The average household size was 2.73. There were 30,074 families (67.9% of all households); the average family size was 3.22.

The population was spread out, with 28,000 people (22.9%) under the age of 18, 10,946 people (9.0%) aged 18 to 24, 35,834 people (29.4%) aged 25 to 44, 32,903 people (27.0%) aged 45 to 64, and 14,384 people (11.8%) who were 65 years of age or older. The median age was 37.0 years. For every 100 females, there were 98.8 males. For every 100 females age 18 and over, there were 97.0 males.

The homeowner vacancy rate was 1.9%; the rental vacancy rate was 7.0%. 71,004 people (58.2% of the population) lived in owner-occupied housing units and 50,016 people (41.0%) lived in rental housing units.

Government 

Politics
In 2017, Concord had 65,061 registered voters with 31,759 (48.8%) registered as Democrats, 14,447 (22.2%) registered as Republicans, and 15,623 (24%) no party preference voters.

Economy 

Concord has been primarily a bedroom community for San Francisco and Oakland over the last forty years, but during the last decades, jobs within the city have increased. Round Table Pizza is headquartered in Concord. Concord also has a strong retail sector including the Sunvalley Shopping Center, which used to be one of the 50 largest malls in the United States, auto dealerships, and Costco. Prior to its dissolution, Atrivo was headquartered in Concord.

Top employers 

According to the city's 2019 Comprehensive Annual Financial Report, the top employers in the city are:

Naval Weapons Station 

To the north of the city of Concord is the Concord Naval Weapons Station (CNWS), which was established in 1942. The station functioned as a World War II armament storage depot, supplying ships at Port Chicago. The CNWS supported war efforts during the Vietnam War and through the end of the Gulf War, processing and shipping out thousands of tons of material to Southeast Asia and the Middle East.

The station consists of two areas: the inland area which is within the Concord city limits, and tidal area. Because of changes in military operations, parts of the inland area began to be mothballed and by 1999, the CNWS had only a minimal contingent of military personnel. In 2007, the U.S. Federal Government announced that the inland portion of the CNWS will be closed. The tidal area of the base is not scheduled for closure. The tidal area was transferred to the U.S. Army Surface Deployment and Distribution Command (SDDC) and is now known as Military Ocean Terminal Concord (MOTCO). The city is working on a reuse plan that may include developing the land while keeping a large portion for open-space and parks projects. The city has had many meetings on this subject and any plan for reuse is subject to approval by the Navy.

Transportation 

Until 1995, the city was the eastern terminus of the Concord line of Bay Area Rapid Transit (BART) commuter train system; the line has since been extended eastward to Pittsburg/Bay Point in 1996 and Antioch in 2018. The County Connection provides limited public transportation in the city and to other points in the county. Buses run from the North Concord BART station to Martinez, the county seat.

Main thoroughfares include Willow Pass Road, Concord Avenue, Concord Boulevard, Clayton Road, Monument Boulevard, Ygnacio Valley Road, Oak Grove Road and Treat Boulevard. The city is also served by Interstate 680, and state highways 4 and 242.

Buchanan Field Airport is a public county-owned airfield in the City of Concord. It is served by JSX, and previously served by American Eagle, WestAir Commuter Airlines, Pacific Southwest Airlines (PSA) and later by PSA successor USAir with the latter two airlines operating nonstop jet service between the airfield and Los Angeles International Airport (LAX).

Media

News 

The city of Concord is served by the daily newspaper the East Bay Times (formerly the Contra Costa Times) published by Bay Area News Group-East Bay (part of the Media News Group, Denver, Colorado), with offices in Walnut Creek. The paper was originally run and owned by the Lesher family. Since the death of Dean Lesher in 1993, the paper has had several owners. The publisher also issues a weekly paper, the Concord Transcript for Concord and nearby Clayton.

The city is also served by Concord Patch, a local news website covering community news and events, and by a news and talk blog called Claycord.com. Patch Media is owned by AOL Inc.

Radio 

Concord falls within the catchment area of many high-power San Francisco Bay Area radio stations although some stations from Sacramento are also available.

KVHS FM 90.5 also known as "The Edge" is a Concord-based student run radio station. It is run from the campus of Clayton Valley Charter High School.

Concord and the neighboring cities of Pleasant Hill and Walnut Creek are also served by KKDV FM 92.1. The commercial station brands itself "Diablo Valley's hometown station" and plays a mix of current hits and those from the last few decades.

From 1963 to 1993, Concord had a local radio station, KWUN AM 1480, also known as Contra Costa's K-15.

Television 

Concord is served by major television stations broadcasting primarily out of San Francisco, Sacramento, and San Jose. The region's Fox affiliate, KTVU, is based in (and licensed to) Oakland at Jack London Square along with co-owned independent station KICU-TV (licensed to San Jose).

Over-the-air reception is difficult in many parts of the city due to hills on either side of the valley.

The sole Concord-licensed TV station, KTNC, gave up its broadcast frequency as part of the FCC reverse spectrum auction in 2017. It had broadcast on channel 42 from the top of Mount Diablo, but is now available on virtual channel 42 via a subchannel of KCNS channel 39.

Education 

Concord is served by the Mount Diablo Unified School District (MDUSD). Among the MDUSD schools is Mt. Diablo High School, opened in 1901 and currently home to four academies, including the Digital Safari Academy, a three-year program involving the integration of multimedia with the core curriculum through integrated, project-based learning.

Beyond MDUSD schools, Clayton Valley Charter High School is also home to several acclaimed academies. Catholic schools De La Salle High School for boys and Carondelet High School for girls are also located here. De La Salle's football team holds the U.S. record winning streak of 151 games, set between 1992 and 2004. During that span, De La Salle won 12 California North Coast sectional championships and was named national champion five different times (once by ESPN, four times by USA Today). In August 2014, a Hollywood film titled When the Game Stands Tall was released with the plot line based on their 151-game winning streak.

California State University, East Bay has a campus in Concord.

Concord High School won the 2010 Northern California Boys Division II Football Championship, coached by Brian Hamilton. Ygnacio Valley High School won the 1987 Northern California Boys Division I Basketball Championship, coached by Jim Grace.

Public libraries 

The Concord Library of the Contra Costa County Library is located in Concord. The library is adjacent to the Concord Civic Center.

Arts and culture 

Concord is the home of the annual Concord Jazz Festival and was the home of the Concord Records jazz record label until it was bought in 1999. Jazz musician Dave Brubeck was born in Concord and in 2006 a park adjacent to Concord High School on Concord Boulevard was renamed in his honor.

Concord is also home to the 20-time World Champion Blue Devils Drum and Bugle Corps. The corps is made up of talented musicians from around the world. The Concord Blue Devils are the most decorated drum and bugle corps in the history of Drum Corps International.

The Public-access television channel is operated through TelVue Virtual Television Networks.

The headquarters of the Kabul Soccer Club is located in Concord.

Points of interest 

 Baldwin Community Park and the Concord Senior Center
 Blue Devils Drum and Bugle Corps
 Buchanan Field Airport
 Camp Concord at South Lake Tahoe, a family-oriented summer camp, although not located in Concord, is operated by the city.
 Concord Pavilion – amphitheater, a major regional concert venue formerly known as the Sleep Train Pavilion and as the Chronicle Pavilion at Concord.
 Concord Skatepark
 Dave Brubeck Park
 Don Francisco Galindo House
 Don Salvio Pacheco Adobe
 Hillcrest Park – home to Matteo's Dream, a playground for children of all abilities
 Lime Ridge Open Space
 Markham Regional Arboretum
 Matteo's Dreamall-abilities playground
 Newhall Community Park
 Port Chicago Naval Magazine National Memorial
 Rick Sears Memorial Park
 Shiva Murugan Temple
 Six Flags Hurricane Harbor Concord
 Starting point of the Iron Horse Regional Trail
 Sunvalley Mall
 Todos Santos Plaza – site of farmer's market, concerts, and movies
 West Wind Solano Drive-In Theater
 Willow Pass Community Park
 Ygnacio Valley Park

Sister city 

In 1974, Concord became a sister city with Kitakami, Iwate, in Japan. The city established a small Japanese-style park in the city, and placed half of a sculpture, The Communion Bridge, in it. The matching half of the bridge is in Kitakami.

Every five years, a delegation from Concord visits Kitakami and operates a student exchange program.

Notable people 

 Carlos Alazraqui, comedian, television actor, voice-over artist, voice of the Taco Bell chihuahua
 Blake Anderson, comedian, writer, producer, and actor was born in Concord
 Autopsy, death metal band
 George Barnes, jazz musician, long-time resident
 Edi Birsan, game designer and member of the City Council
 Dave Brubeck, festival promoter, jazz musician, orchestra leader; born in Concord
 Gil Castillo, mixed martial artist has been a resident
 Natalie Coughlin, Olympic gold-medalist, has been a resident
 Tom Hanks, Oscar-winning actor, producer, and director was born in Concord
 Eva Marie, female professional wrestler formerly signed to the WWE
 Cass McCombs, singer and songwriter was born in Concord
 Brent Mydland, keyboardist for the Grateful Dead from 1979 to 1990
 Negativland, experimental music group
 Reed Nesbit, urologist, pioneer of transurethral resection of the prostate
 Kyle Newacheck, TV writer, was born in Concord
 Natalie Nunn, reality tv star, entrepreneur, producer
 Salvio Pacheco, historically important Californio ranchero
 Meredith Patterson, Broadway actress was born in Concord
 Bernt Wahl, mathematician, scientist, entrepreneur, and author was a long-time resident

See also 

 List of cities and towns in California
 List of cities and towns in the San Francisco Bay Area

References

External links 

 
 
 One Concord Centerconference and event facility

 
Cities in Contra Costa County, California
Cities in the San Francisco Bay Area
Incorporated cities and towns in California
Populated places established in 1869
1869 establishments in California